Tokio Marine HCC is an international specialty insurance group with offices across the United States, the United Kingdom, Spain, and Ireland. The company is based in Houston, Texas, U.S.A. but has major offices in Atlanta, Barcelona, Boston, Chicago, Dallas, Detroit, Farmington (CT), Frederick (MD), Ireland, Leicester (UK), London, Los Angeles, Madrid, Mount Kisco (NY), and New York City.

History
The company (formerly HCC Insurance Holdings, Inc.) was formed as Houston Casualty Company in 1974 by Stephen L. Way. Since the company's founding, it has been consistently profitable, generally reporting annual increases in revenue and shareholder's equity. The company reports to have paid shareholder dividends for 67 consecutive quarters.

In 2010, it posted $2.6 billion on gross premiums written, $2.3 billion in total revenue, earnings of $345 million, and Combined Ratio of less than 85%. Assets exceed $9.1 billion. Tokio Marine HCC was ranked 827 in the 2009 edition of the Fortune 1000. The company has strong financial ratings including an A. M. Best rating of A+ (superior), Standard & Poor's rating of AA− (very strong), and Fitch Group rating of AA− (very strong).

On June 10, 2015, the company announced it was being acquired by Japan's Tokio Marine for a fee of $7.5 billion.

On October 27, 2015, the company announced the closing of the acquisition by Tokio Marine. The aggregate consideration paid in connection with the merger was approximately $7.5 billion and the merger became effective at 4:05 p.m. EDT.

Operations and services
Tokio Marine HCC underwrites more than 100 classes of Specialty Insurance within five segments:

 U.S. Property & Casualty provides insurance coverage for aviation, small account errors & omissions liability, public entity, employment practices liability, title, residual value, disability, kidnap & ransom, contingency, brown water marine, criminal justice service operations, and technical property needs.
 Professional Liability provides professional liability insurance including directors and officers liability insurance, large account errors & omissions liability, diversified financial products, and fidelity insurance.
 Accident & Health provides medical stop-loss, short-term domestic & international medical, HMO reinsurance, and medical excess insurance.
 U.S. Surety & Credit provides insurance coverage for contract, commercial, and court bonds as well as credit insurance.
 International provides insurance coverage for energy, property treaty, liability, professional indemnity, surety, credit, commercial property, marine hull, and accident & health insurance products. As of 2021, the company underwrites insurance for businesses in approximately 180 different countries.

Aviation 
Aviation was the first line of insurance provided by Tokio Marine HCC. Since 1974, the company underwrites in the U.S. in general aviation, a category which includes many types of aircraft from helicopters to home made private planes, corporate jets, and antique "warbirds". The company's insurance for aviation includes hull, liability, spares, cargo, and war, as well as many unique coverages. Altogether, HCC Aviation insures approximately 45,000 aircraft in the United States and more than 60 countries worldwide. Almost all the company's aviation insurance is written on three of the corporation's insurance companies.

Avemco 
Avemco Insurance Company was a stand-alone NYSE company and acquired by Tokio Marine HCC in 1997. Avemco sells direct to the consumer through its national call center in Frederick, Maryland, and online through its website. Avemco provides traditional coverage on its standard policy. It also provides unique, non-owned aircraft policy coverage which protects renters and borrowers of general aviation aircraft. Both the aircraft and non-owner policies can be extensively modified by endorsement to meet the needs of the customer. An integral part of the aircraft community, Avemco invests considerable resources in loss prevention efforts and insurance education through air shows, Federal Aviation Administration and industry initiatives, articles in aviation trade journals, and other forums.

Houston Casualty Aviation 
Houston Casualty Company Aviation (HC Aviation) writes a combination of international and U.S. commercial aviation insurance with a primary focus on the needs of large commercial businesses and internationally based risks. All of HC Aviation's insurance involves commercial fixed and rotor wing business. It sells many types of insurance with particular emphasis on second and third tier airlines, helicopters, government, military, and police operations. It provides insurance to many South and Central American military (air forces), government, and police operations. Because these types of risks are non-commercial and some of the types of aircraft are military, they require special understanding and expertise from both an underwriting and claims perspective. Due to the unique nature of the business, no single policy is the same as each risk is written and the policy developed on a customized basis.

US Specialty Insurance Aviation 
USSIC Aviation writes General Aviation and Special Risk insurance. The General Aviation insurance provides insurance through brokers and agents and represents a portfolio of commercial operations insurance including charter, cargo, aerial photography and many other "for hire purposes" aviation insurance. It provides coverage for commercial aircraft as well as private aircraft owned and operated by individuals. It offers coverage for rotor wing aircraft flown both for private and commercial purposes. In addition to hull and liability, General Aviation issues policies for airports which includes overages for premises, non-critical products, completed operations and hangar-keeper's legal liability. The Special Risks insurance offers coverage for aircraft that do not fit the typical definition of general aviation. These aircraft include antiques, classics, seaplanes, experimental aircraft, and warbirds. Pilots who wish to transition to more complex aircraft can obtain insurance through Special Risks. USSIC Aviation is a market leader for air show liability, insuring a majority of the nation's air shows each year. USSIC Aviation is the largest insurer of war-birds (that is, propeller and jet driven military surplus aircraft owned individually or held by aircraft museums). These aircraft are unique - often one of a kind - and obtaining the right insurance can be challenging. USSIC Aviation partners with aircraft owners and pilots to provide the coverage they need and to ensure the aircraft are operated and maintained in a safe manner.

Professional liability 
The company underwrites Directors and officers liability insurance through its HCC Global subsidiary. A large number of public and private companies, financial institutions, and commercial companies rely on D&O insurance. The company offers both domestic U.S. and international coverage. The company reports to have relationships with approximately 550 brokers in more than 50 countries. Company employees represent more than 20 nationalities bringing multilingual skills and experience.

Accident and health 
With the acquisition of LDG Management Company Incorporated in 1996, Tokio Marine HCC began writing medical stop-loss insurance and made a pivotal entry into the Life, Accident and Health industry. Through subsequent acquisitions and by maintaining a strong underwriting focus, the company has been in medical stop-loss insurance, as well as in the HMO reinsurance, provider excess, medical excess, sports disability, short term medical and international medical insurance markets.

Medical stop-loss insurance is the major component of the business segment.

Tokio Marine HCC also offers high-limit sports disability insurance to protect against the future loss of earnings of athletes who may become temporarily or permanently disabled and can no longer continue their professional sports career. Coverage is available for the team or individual players.

International operations 
Houston Casualty Company was authorized by Her Majesty's Treasury in 1998 to operate a full branch office in the United Kingdom, and the company opened its London branch to more closely align its underwriting operations with the London Market. HCC now has offices across the United Kingdom, Ireland, and Spain that provide a broad range of specialty insurance coverage including Energy, Marine, Commercial Property, Credit, Professional Indemnity, Surety Bonds, Political Risks, Accident and Health, General Liability, and Property Treaty. Tokio Marine HCC is an owner of a Lloyd's managing agency and 100% capital provider of a Lloyd's syndicate.

In anticipation of Brexit, a new insurance company Tokio Marine Europe S.A. (TME) was set up in Luxembourg,  following regulatory approval from the Commissariat aux Assurances (CAA) and the Japanese Financial Services Authority (JFSA). TME operates as a subsidiary of HCC International Insurance Company plc and in partnership with Tokio Marine Kiln. This ensures that Tokio Marine Group is able to continue servicing its clients in the European Economic Area (EEA) and to offer them stability through a seamless transition. 
With approval from the High Court of England and Wales, the Part VII process of transferring the existing portfolio of policies written out of Continental European operations to Tokio Marine Europe S.A. was executed.

On 7 May 2018, S&P Global Ratings assigned its “AA- (Very Strong)” financial strength rating to Tokio Marine Europe S.A. with a positive outlook.

Growth and acquisitions
The company has grown organically (growing market share with existing products) by adding new products as well as acquisitions of other insurance businesses. The company also divested business positions to retain its strong focus on underwriting of specialty insurance products.

 In 2020, the company acquires GCube, a renewable energy risks specialist.
In 2019, the company acquires NAS Insurance Services, LLC, in cyber and professional liability solutions in the U.S.
In 2018, the company acquires Qdos Contractor, a provider of insurance products and services to the UK independent contractor and freelancer market.
In 2017, the company acquires AIG's Medical Stop-Loss and Organ Transplant operations.
In 2016, the company acquires Bail USA, Inc., a wholesale bail agency  and On Call International, a provider of fully customized travel risk management services.
 In 2015, the company acquires Producers Ag Insurance Group (ProAg), a writer of crop insurance.
 In 2014, the company celebrated 40 years of Mind over Risk; Select Casualty unit started to provide general liability coverage to small and mid-size enterprises; HCC Medical Insurance Services expands with new Travel Insurance team.
 In 2013, the company enters the North American construction property risks markets, and begins to offer builders risk treaty reinsurance out of London office.
 In 2011, the company opened Primary Casualty and Excess Casualty divisions.
 In 2010, the company started a Technical Property division.
 In 2009, the company sold its reinsurance brokerage business Rattner MacKenzie Limited and transferred rights relating to brown water marine to its original owner. The company also combined two Lloyd's syndicates to achieve more operational efficiency. The company formed a Property Treaty underwriting team.
 In 2008, the company acquired Cox Insurance Group, Arrowhead Public Risk, VMGU Insurance Agency, the Surety Company of the Pacific, and MultiNational Underwriters.
 In 2006, the company acquired Novia Underwriters, Inc., G.B. Kenrick & Associates, and the Health Products Division of Allianz Life Insurance.
 In 2005, the company acquired US Surety company, DeMontfort Group, Ltd., Perico Ltd., MIC Life Insurance, and the Ilium Insurance Group.
 In 2004, the company acquired American Contractors Indemnity Company and RA&MCO Insurance companies.
 In 2002, the company acquired Dickson Manchester Ltd. and MAG Global Financial Products.
 In 1999, the company acquired Centris Group Inc. (insurance company). The same year, the company also acquired Midwest Stop Loss Underwriters.
 In 1998, the company acquired Guarantee Insurance Resources.
 In 1997, the company acquired Managed Group Underwriting.
 In 1996, the company acquired LDG Management Company.

References

External links

Financial services companies established in 1974
Companies formerly listed on the New York Stock Exchange
Insurance companies of the United States
Companies based in Houston
Insurance companies based in Texas
Tokio Marine
American subsidiaries of foreign companies
2015 mergers and acquisitions